Levin R. Marshall (October 10, 1800 – July 24, 1870) was an American banker and planter in the Antebellum South. He was a founder and President of the Commercial Bank of Natchez, Mississippi. He owned 14,000 acres in Mississippi and Louisiana, and 10,000 acres in Arkansas.

Early life
Levin R. Marshall was born October 10, 1800, in Alexandria, Virginia. His father, Henry Marshall, was from Maryland, and related to Chief Justice Marshall. His maternal grandfather, Stephen Minor, was a prominent planter.

Career
Marshall started his career as a banker for the United States bank in Woodville, Mississippi. In 1831, he moved to Natchez, Mississippi, where he continued his work as a banker. He then established his own bank, the Commercial Bank of Natchez. Marshall also owned the Mansion Hotel in Natchez and worked for the commission house J. B. Byrne & Co. of New Orleans, Louisiana as well as Marshall, Reynolds, and Co. of Natchez. In 1825, he led a group of local children to welcome Gilbert du Motier, Marquis de Lafayette to Natchez.

Marshall owned many cotton and sugar plantations in Mississippi, Louisiana, and Arkansas. Indeed, he owned five plantations in Mississippi and Louisiana which spanned 14,000 acres, and 10,000 acres in Arkansas. By the 1850s, he produced more than 4,000 bales of cotton every year. In 1860, he owned 817 African slaves. He also owned a large livestock herd. For a time, Henry Wirz worked as an overseer on one of Marshall's plantations in Louisiana; Wirz would later serve in the Confederate Army as commandant of the notorious prisoner-of-war camp known as Andersonville.

Personal life
In 1826, Marshall married Maria Chotard (1807–1834), the daughter of John Marie Chotard, in Woodville, Mississippi. They had four children, only one of whom survived: George Matthews Marshall, who later married Charlotte Hunt, the daughter of planter David Hunt, and resided at the Lansdowne Plantation. A portrait of Levin R. Marshall and George M. Marshall painted by Louis Joseph Bahin hangs in the dining room at Lansdowne.

After Maria's death, Marshall remarried to Sarah E. Elliott Ross, daughter of Dr. Elliott and widow of Isaac Ross. They had eight children. They resided at Richmond in Natchez and also maintained a residence in Westchester County, New York.

Death
Marshall died on July 24, 1870, at the age of 69.

References

1800 births
1870 deaths
Businesspeople from Alexandria, Virginia
People from Woodville, Mississippi
People from Natchez, Mississippi
People from Westchester County, New York
American bankers
American planters
American slave owners